Ozzy Inguanzo is a Cuban-American screenwriter, producer, and published author. He received the Writers Guild of America Award for Best Documentary Screenplay in 2019.

Career

Film 
Inguanzo is a frequent collaborator with director James Mangold, most recently working on the Academy Award-nominated films Ford v Ferrari and Logan. As a consultant, he has worked with directors, writers, production designers, and executives, contributing his research, world building skills, and character ideas that are then utilized in the story development and scriptwriting process.

Inguanzo began his career with an apprenticeship at Walt Disney Pictures with Dean Tavoularis, the acclaimed production designer of The Godfather films. He served as a primary aide to director Sam Raimi during the Spider-Man trilogy, and worked with Academy Award-winning screenwriter Alvin Sargent during story and script development for what were initially planned as the third and fourth final installments of the film franchise.

In 2013, Inguanzo directed and produced Tomas Milian: Acting on Instinct, also executive produced by Academy Award-winner Bob Murawski, which was included in the digitally remastered Blu-ray release of Spaghetti Western cult classic The Big Gundown.

Inguanzo wrote and co-produced Bathtubs Over Broadway, which premiered at the Tribeca Film Festival and was released by Focus Features in 2018. The film, executive produced by Blumhouse Television, Impact Partners, and David Letterman, received critical acclaim on the festival circuit, culminating in Inguanzo winning the Writers Guild Award for Best Documentary Screenplay. He went on to produce the motion picture soundtrack for the film, which was released in August 2019 through Universal’s Back Lot Music label.

Inguanzo produced Television Event, which was an official selection for the 2020 Tribeca Film Festival and DOC NYC, where it made its world premiere. The film received acclaim on the festival circuit, and won awards for Best Film and Best Director at Sidewalk Film Festival and RiverRun International Film Festival respectfully.

Published works 
Inguanzo’s latest book, Ghostbusters: Afterlife: The Art and Making of the Movie, was published by Titan Books December 7, 2021. The book provides an in-depth look at the creative development and production of the next chapter in the original Ghostbusters universe. Ghostbusters: Afterlife director Jason Reitman supplies the book’s foreword. 

Inguanzo’s first book, Constructing Green Lantern: From Page to Screen, was published by DC Comics and Rizzoli in 2011, chronicling the visual development and making of the Warner Bros. live-action feature film starring Ryan Reynolds. The book’s introduction was written by comic book writer, screenwriter, and producer Geoff Johns.

In 2014, Rizzoli published Inguanzo’s next book, Zombies on Film: The Definitive Story of Undead Cinema, a non-fiction history of the Zombie film genre throughout its first nine decades. Japanese and French translations of the book were subsequently published by PIE International (ゾンビ映画年代記) and Hoëbeke (Les Zombies au Cinéma).

References

External links 

Year of birth missing (living people)
Living people
American people of Cuban descent
University of Miami alumni
Writers Guild of America Award winners
Screenwriters from Florida